Chawar may refer to:
Chavar, city in Iran
 Ghawar Field, oil field in Saudi Arabia